John Maddison Morton (3 January 1811 – 19 December 1891) was an English playwright who specialised in one-act farces. His most famous farce was Box and Cox (1847). He also wrote comic dramas, pantomimes and other theatrical pieces.

Biography
Morton was born in Pangbourne. His father, Thomas Morton, was also a well-known dramatist.

Morton's first farce, My First Fit of the Gout, was produced in London in 1835. He was the author of several other one-act farces, including My Husband's Ghost (1836), Chaos Is Come Again (1838), A Thumping Legacy (1843), Lend Me Five Shillings (1846), The Irish Tiger (1846), Done on Both Sides (1847), Who's My Husband? (1847), Going to the Derby (1848), Slasher and Crasher! (1848), Your Life's in Danger (1848), Where There's a Will There's a Way (1849), A Most Unwarrantable Intrusion (1849) My Precious Betsy (1850), Sent to the Tower (1850), Grimshaw, Bagshaw, and Bradshaw (1851), The Woman I Adore! (1852), A Capital Match! (1852), Waiting for an Omnibus in the Lowther Arcade on a Rainy Day (1854), A Game of Romps (1855), How Stout You're Getting! (1855), The Rights and Wrongs of Women (1856), The Little Savage (1858), Wooing One's Wife (1861), Drawing Rooms, Second Floor, and Attics (1864), My Wife's Bonnet (1865) and A Day's Fishing (1869).

Morton lived in Chertsey for many years. It was there that he wrote Box and Cox (1847), adapting it from a French play. The New York Times in 1891 called it "the best farce of the nineteenth century". Box and Cox was wildly successful, earning him about £7000, and was translated into many European languages. A musical version, Cox and Box (1867), was created by F. C. Burnand and Arthur Sullivan, but Morton received no royalties from it. However, it brought him a measure of fame as it is often revived by Gilbert and Sullivan fans, helping to make it his best known work.

Morton wrote several comic dramas in two acts, including Old Honesty (1848), All That Glitters Is Not Gold (1851), From Village to Court (1854), The Muleteer of Toledo, or King, Queen and Knave (1855), Our Wife, or The Rose of Amiens (1856), A Husband to Order (1859), She Would and He Wouldn't (1862), Woodcock's Little Game (1864) and Little Mother (1870). Our Wife was made into an 1883 operetta by John Philip Sousa called Désirée.

Many of Morton's pieces enjoyed great success and contributed to building up the reputations of leading comic actors such as John Buckstone (who was Box in the first representation of Box and Cox), Henry Compton and the Keeleys. In 1873 Marion Terry made her first West End appearances in his plays, A Game of Romps and All That Glitters Is Not Gold at the Olympic Theatre. Sullivan's later collaborator W.S. Gilbert made reference to the well-known Morton in his story "My First Brief".
 
In Morton's last decades, the popularity of Victorian burlesque greatly diminished the market for farces. He fell on hard times and in 1881 became a Charterhouse pensioner. His last new play to be produced in his lifetime, at Toole's Theatre in 1885, was a three-act farcical comedy called Going It, which kept the house in a continual roar of laughter. It was said of Morton that "The unlucky thing about him was that though he could write as well at 80 as at 30, he was left stranded high and dry by the receding wave of fashion." He died at the Charterhouse on 19 December 1891 and was buried on the 23rd at Kensal Green Cemetery.

Modern revivals
Despite his prolific play writing career, Morton has not been performed regularly since his death, with the exception of Cox and Box. In 1967 Kenneth Tynan wrote that a "re-discovery is long overdue". In 1967 the National Theatre performed Morton's A Most Unwarrantable Intrusion as part of a triple bill including a play by John Lennon.

As a bicentenary celebration of Morton's birth, in June 2011 the Orange Tree Theatre presented a triple bill of three of Morton's one act farces, Slasher and Crasher!, A Most Unwarrantable Intrusion and Grimshaw, Bagshaw and Bradshaw, directed by Henry Bell.  The Guardian'''s  reviewer  Michael Billington commented that the production "proves the prolific Morton is unjustly neglected", praising Bell's productions.

Notes and references
Notes

 Works 

 Box and Cox: A Romance of Real Life in One Act. (1848)
 A Desperate Game: A Comic Drama in One Act (1853)
 Woodcock's Little Game: A Comedy Farce, In Two Acts (1864) Drawing Rooms, Second Floor, and Attics:  A Farce, in One Act (1864)

References

Bibliography
Tynan, Kenneth (1994). The Kenneth Tynan Letters''. London: Minerva. .

External links

 
 
 
Full script of Box and Cox
Full scripts of several farces by Morton
Details of first productions of Box and Cox
Much information about Box and Cox

1811 births
1891 deaths
People from Pangbourne
English male dramatists and playwrights
19th-century English dramatists and playwrights
Burials at Kensal Green Cemetery
19th-century English male writers